Wanna Make Love is the debut album by Dayton, Ohio funk band Sun. It was originally titled Live On, Dream On but was re-released by Capitol several months later as Wanna Make Love due to the success of the single "Wanna Make Love".

Track listing
"Live On, Dream On" (Byron Byrd) – 4:49
"Tell the People" (Byron Byrd, John Wagner) – 3:11
"My Woman" (Byron Byrd) – 5:10 
"They're Calling for Me" (Chris Jones) – 7:05
"Wanna Make Love" (Byron Byrd) – 3:36
"Love Is Never Sure" (Harry McLoud, John Wagner) – 4:52
"The Show Is Over" (Byron Byrd, John Wagner, Harry McLoud, Chris Jones, Hollis Melson, Gregory Webster, Clarence Willis) – 3:59
"It's Killing Me" (Chris Jones) – 4:18
"Give Your Love to Me" (Chris Jones) – 4:01

Personnel
Byron Byrd – flute, piano, clavinet, bass, percussion, electric piano, synthesizer, tenor saxophone, lead and backing vocals
Chris Jones – trumpet, piano, clavinet, vibraphone, drums, percussion, synthesizer, lead and backing Vocals
Dean Hummons – organ, clavinet, piano, electric piano, synthesizer
Hollis Melson – bass, percussion, lead and backing vocals
Kym Yancey – drums, percussion, backing vocals
John Wagner – trumpet, flugelhorn, trombone, percussion, lead and backing vocals
Shawn Sandridge – lead guitar, backing vocals
Linda Thornton – backing vocals
Roger Troutman – guitar, talk box
Lester Troutman – drums

Charts

Singles

References

External links
 Sun-Wanna Make Love at Discogs

1976 debut albums
Sun (R&B band) albums
Capitol Records albums